Valeriy Filippovich Gorbach (11 August 1968 – 5 January 2022) was a Tajikistani footballer who played as a defender. He died from heart failure in January 2022, at the age of 53.

His sole international match came in June 1997 against Turkmenistan.

References

1968 births
2022 deaths
People from Navoiy Region
Soviet footballers
Tajikistani footballers
Association football defenders
Tajikistan international footballers
Russian Premier League players
Buxoro FK players
FC Fakel Voronezh players
Tajikistani expatriate footballers
Tajikistani expatriate sportspeople in Russia
Expatriate footballers in Russia